The Quatuor brillant in A major, is a composition for violin and string trio by Joseph Kreutzer, dedicated to the composer's father.  The work was first published by Simrock perhaps around 1815.

Structure

The composition is in three movements:

Allegro
Adagio
Rondo

External links

Compositions for string quartet
Compositions in A major